Dustley Roman Mulder (born 27 January 1985) is a former professional footballer who played as a right back. Born in the Netherlands, he represented the Curaçao national team at international level. He works as a youth coach with NAC Breda.

Club career

Youth years
Mulder was born in Baarn, and is a product of Feyenoord's youth academy. In 2004, he started playing for Feyenoord's satellite team SBV Excelsior.

Excelsior
Mulder made his debut in professional football as part of the Excelsior Rotterdam squad in the 2004–05 season. For two seasons there, he made 46 caps, scoring 4 goals.

RKC Waalwijk
In 2006, Mulder started playing for RKC Waalwijk. For five seasons he became an irreplaceable part of the right part of the defense, making 153 or more caps and scoring 4 goals. Mulder left Waalwijk at the end of the 2009–10 season, when his contract expired.

Levski Sofia
On 30 June 2010, Mulder agreed to join Bulgarian side Levski Sofia. On the following day he made his unofficial debut in a friendly against Metalist Kharkiv, before signing a two-year contract on 2 July as a free agent. He made his competitive debut on 22 July in a 2–0 away win over Dundalk in the second qualifying round of the 2010–11 UEFA Europa League.

On 8 December 2011, Mulder signed a one-year contract extension, keeping him at Levski until 2013.

He scored his first goal for Levski on 25 August 2012 in a 2–0 win against Montana at the Ogosta Stadium. In January 2013, it was reported that Mulder had extended his contract with Levski. The new two-year contract was signed on 15 January. Mulder ended 2012–13 season with a total of 5 goals.

In the summer of 2013 he was temporarily released from Levski, but was reinstated to the first team a month later.

In December 2013 during a game against CSKA Sofia for the Bulgarian Cup, Mulder scored the last penalty for his team in the 7–6 win which led the team to the quarterfinals of the tournament. Mulder made his last appearance for Levski Sofia on 24 May 2014, after replacing Elin Topuzakov in the first half of a 3–2 win over Lazio in an exhibition match, which was held in commemoration of 100 years since the founding of the "blues". In the beginning of June 2014 new appointed sports director of Levski announced that the "bluemen" would no longer use Dustley's services as player. After four years of playing for the Bulgarian club, Mulder made 95 appearances in which he scored 2 goals.

Apollon Limassol
In July 2014, Mulder signed a one-year contract with Cypriot club Apollon Limassol, with an option for an additional year. He made his official debut on 21 August 2014, in the 1–1 home draw with Lokomotiv Moscow in a UEFA Europa League match after coming on as a substitute during the second half.

NAC Breda
In July 2015, Mulder joined Dutch side NAC Breda for one year, with the possibility of a second one.

International career
Mulder made his debut for the Curaçaoa national team in a qualification match for the 2018 World Cup against Montserrat on 28 March 2015. With Curaçao, Mulder won the final of the 2017 Caribbean Cup on 25 June 2017 by beating Jamaica 2–1. At that time, he was not under contract with any club.

Managerial career
In mid-2018, Mulder became a player-assistant coach at BSV Boeimeer. In July 2020, he was appointed assistant coach of the NAC Breda under-18 side under head coach Rogier Molhoek.

Career statistics

Club

Honours
Curaçao
 Caribbean Cup: 2017

References

External links
 Mulder at Levski's site
 Mulder statistic
 Profile at Levskisofia.info

1985 births
Living people
People from Baarn
Association football fullbacks
Curaçao footballers
Curaçao international footballers
Dutch footballers
Dutch people of Curaçao descent
Dutch expatriate footballers
Eredivisie players
Eerste Divisie players
First Professional Football League (Bulgaria) players
Cypriot First Division players
Excelsior Rotterdam players
RKC Waalwijk players
PFC Levski Sofia players
Apollon Limassol FC players
NAC Breda players
Expatriate footballers in Bulgaria
Dutch expatriate sportspeople in Bulgaria
Expatriate footballers in Cyprus
2014 Caribbean Cup players
2017 CONCACAF Gold Cup players
NAC Breda non-playing staff
Footballers from Utrecht (province)
Dutch expatriate sportspeople in Cyprus
Association football coaches